0141 632 6326 is the fourth album by Scottish rock band Gun. The number used in the title is now a telephone number for a driving school in Scotland but at the time GUN used it, was a number you could call to hear band members give out news on the band and leave messages for them. The album was quite successful, reaching 32 in the UK. Crazy You and My Sweet Jane were also moderate chart hits. It is also the last album to feature vocalist and founding member Mark Rankin.

Track listing 
 "Rescue You"
 "Crazy You"
 "Seventeen"
 "All My Love"
 "My Sweet Jane"
 "Come A Long Way"
 "All I Ever Wanted"
 "I Don't Mind"
 "Going Down"
 "Always Friends"

References 

Gun (band) albums
1997 albums
A&M Records albums
Polydor Records albums